There are several events involving the Apache known as Apache War, the Apache Wars, or Apache Campaign:

Apache–Mexico Wars (1600s–1915)
Apache Wars (1849–1924)
Jicarilla War (1849–1855)
Chiricahua Wars (1851–1886)
Chiricahua War (1860–1873)
Yavapai War (1871–1875)
Apache Campaign (1873)
Renegade Period (1879–1924)
Victorio's War (1879–1881)
Geronimo's War (1881–1886)
Apache Campaign (1889–1890)
Apache Campaign (1896)

Apache Wars
Apache